Heterixalus madagascariensis (commonly referred to as the blue-back reed frog, or occasionally the powder-blue reed frog) is a species of frog in the family Hyperoliidae endemic to Madagascar.
Its natural habitats are subtropical or tropical dry forests, subtropical or tropical moist lowland forests, moist savanna, subtropical or tropical seasonally wet or flooded lowland grassland, swamps, freshwater marshes, intermittent freshwater marshes, sandy shores, arable land, urban areas, heavily degraded former forests, ponds, irrigated land, and seasonally flooded agricultural land.

It is a popular choice of amphibian in the pet trade because of its beautiful colors and ease of care in a proper setup.

References

  Josh's Frogs - Reed Frogs of Madagascar

Heterixalus
Endemic frogs of Madagascar
Taxa named by André Marie Constant Duméril
Taxa named by Gabriel Bibron
Amphibians described in 1841
Taxonomy articles created by Polbot